Pushkin: The Last Duel is a 2006 Russian biographical drama film directed by Natalya Bondarchuk.

Plot 
January 27 at the Black River took place by Pushkin and d'Anthès, as a result of which Pushkin was killed. There was a conspiracy around the poet’s family, into which even his friends were drawn. Having learned about the contents of anonymous letters discrediting the name of Natalya Pushkina, the emperor saw in them slander against his family, and he instructs the head of the gendarmes of the secret search office Dubelt to figure this out.

Cast 
 Sergey Bezrukov as Alexander Pushkin
 Anna Snatkina as Natalia Pushkina
 Yevgeny Stychkin as Lermontov
 Andrey Ilyin as Konstantin Danzas
 Andrei Zibrov as Pyotr Vladimirovich Dolgorukov
 Yulian Makarov as Nicholas I of Russia
 Viktor Sukhorukov	as Colonel Galakhov
  Boris Plotnikov as Leonty Dubelt
 Lyobov Povolotskaya as Mariya Nesselrode
 Natalya Bondarchuk as Ekaterina Andreevna Karamzina
 Roman Romantsov as Georges-Charles de Heeckeren d'Anthès
 Inna Makarova as  Ekaterina Zagryazhskaya
 Sergey Nikonenko as  Nikita Kozlov

References

External links 
 

2006 films
2006 biographical drama films
2000s historical drama films
2000s Russian-language films
Russian biographical drama films
Russian historical drama films
Cultural depictions of Alexander Pushkin
Cultural depictions of Nicholas I of Russia
Biographical films about writers
Biographical films about poets
Films about duels